Sergio Fabián Suffo Félix (born February 22, 1986 in Montevideo, Uruguay) is a Uruguayan footballer currently playing for Atenas de San Carlos.

Teams
  Cerro 2006–2010
  San Martín de Mendoza 2010–2011
  Sol de América 2011–2012
  Cerro 2012–2013
  Atenas 2013–present

References
 
 
 Profile at Tenfield Digital 

1986 births
Living people
Uruguayan footballers
Uruguayan expatriate footballers
C.A. Cerro players
Club Sol de América footballers
San Martín de Mendoza footballers
Expatriate footballers in Argentina
Expatriate footballers in Paraguay
Association football defenders